State Route 163 (SR 163) is a  state highway that serves as a north–south connection between Mobile and Theodore through Mobile County. SR 163 intersects SR 193 at its southern terminus and US 90 at its northern terminus.

Route description
SR 163 begins at its intersection with SR 193 in Theodore. From its terminus, SR 163 travels in a northeasterly direction on Hollingers Island and passes the Mobile Downtown Airport en route to its intersection with I-10. From its junction with I-10, SR 163 continues in a northerly direction to its northern terminus at Government Street in central Mobile.

Major intersections

References

163
Transportation in Mobile County, Alabama
Transportation in Mobile, Alabama